Nazarkahrizi (also Romanized as Nazarkahrīzī and Nazar Kahrīzī; also known as Nazar Kahrīz) is a city in Nazarkahrizi District of Hashtrud County, East Azerbaijan province, Iran. At the 2006 census, its population was 1,181 in 227 households. The following census in 2011 counted 1,266 people in 269 households. The latest census in 2016 showed a population of 1,215 people in 348 households.

References 

Hashtrud County

Cities in East Azerbaijan Province

Populated places in East Azerbaijan Province

Populated places in Hashtrud County